The Orman House (built in 1838) is a Florida State Park and historic site located in Apalachicola, in northwestern Florida. The address is 177 5th Street.

Recreational activities
The adjacent Chapman Botanical Garden includes a bronze replica of the Vietnam Veterans Memorial "The Three Soldiers" statue in Washington D.C.

Admission and Hours
The house is open from 9:00 a.m. until 5:00 p.m. on Monday, Thursday, Friday, Saturday, and Sunday. It is closed on Tuesdays, Wednesdays, Thanksgiving, Christmas, and New Years Day.

Admission to the tour is $2.00 per person (children under six free).

Gallery

External links
 Orman House Historic State Park at Florida State Parks
 Chapman Botanical Gardens at Florida State Parks

Apalachicola, Florida
State parks of Florida
Museums in Apalachicola, Florida
Historic house museums in Florida
Houses completed in 1838
1838 establishments in Florida Territory